City of Strangers may refer to:

 City of Strangers: Gulf Migration and the Indian Community in Bahrain
City of Strangers, album by Ute Lemper 1994
City of Strangers (film), alternative title of Japanese film